Retro FM may refer to:
 Retro FM (Estonia), radio station in Estonia
 Retro FM (Russia), radio station in Russia